Robin Koch (born 17 July 1996) is a German professional footballer who plays as a defender for Premier League club Leeds United and the Germany national team.

Koch made his first-team debut for 1. FC Kaiserslautern after graduated from the club's youth system and also played in Bundesliga with SC Freiburg. He has previously played for Eintracht Trier II, Eintracht Trier, 1. FC Kaiserslautern II, 1. FC Kaiserslautern and SC Freiburg. He was included in the Germany U21 team before joining the first-team in November 2019. In August 2020, he signed for Leeds United ahead of their Premier League return and in 2021, represented Germany at UEFA Euro 2020.

Club career

Early career
Koch was born in Kaiserslautern and joined 1. FC Kaiserslautern's academy at the age of five, but switched to SV Dörbach when his family moved to Salmtal. He joined Eintracht Trier's academy in 2009, and despite the fact that "he was never seen as a superstar talent" according to his childhood best friend, he was invited to regional trials by the German Football Association in 2011. He was promoted to Trier's first team in 2014, and made his debut on 22 September 2014 in a 0–0 draw with TuS Koblenz. He scored his first senior goal on 22 November 2014 in a 4–2 victory over SpVgg Neckarelz; A low shot in the 25th minute to put Eintracht Trier 1–0 up. He appeared in 23 league matches for Eintracht Trier across the 2014–15 season, scoring two goals, whilst he also appeared 6 times for their reserve side.

1. FC Kaiserslautern
In 2015, Koch moved to 1. FC Kaiserslautern, initially joining their reserve side. Though he was the son of Kaiserslautern legend Harry Koch, he "tried hard not to live on his father's reputation", living an "unglamorous lifestyle" and "staying off the grid" at Kaiserslautern. He scored once in 26 appearances for Kaiserslautern's reserves in the 2015–16 season. Koch signed his first professional contract with the club in September 2016, with the contract lasting until the summer of 2019. His debut for Kaiserslautern came on 2 October 2016, starting in a 0–0 draw against Arminia Bielefeld in the 2. Bundesliga. He made 24 appearances for Kaiserslautern during the 2016–17 season, and attracted the interest of multiple Bundesliga clubs according to his father Harry.

SC Freiburg
On 22 August 2017, Koch moved to Bundesliga side SC Freiburg. The transfer fee paid to Kaiserslautern was reported as €3.5 million. He made his Bundesliga debut for Freiburg on 22 October 2017 against Hertha Berlin in a 1–1 draw. He scored his first goal for the club on 13 January 2018 in a 1–1 draw against Eintracht Frankfurt.

Leeds United
On 29 August 2020, Koch joined newly-promoted Premier League club Leeds United on a four-year deal, for a transfer fee that was reported to be £13 million. He was signed as a replacement for former loanee Ben White, who was deemed to be too expensive to sign permanently. Koch made his Premier League debut for Leeds in the first match of the season against Liverpool on 12 September 2020, starting in the 3–4 defeat at Anfield to the reigning champions. Koch was described as having a 'rough debut', having given away the penalty resulting in Liverpool's first goal despite the fact that the ball deflected off his thigh, before failing to mark Virgil van Dijk for Liverpool's second. Koch was substituted in the ninth minute of a 3–1 defeat to Chelsea on 5 December after a recurrence of a knee injury suffered in the opening game of the season, and subsequently underwent knee surgery. He made his return to the first team as a late substitute against Fulham on 19 March 2021. Following the appointment of Jesse Marsch as manager at Leeds, and a switch to zonal marking, Koch appeared to take a step up in his game and became a regular starter in central defence towards the end of the 2021/22 season and into 2022/23.

International career

Youth
Having first been called up to Germany's under-21 squad in October 2018, he was part of the Germany U21's squad who finished runner up at the 2019 UEFA European Under-21 Championship after losing the final to Spain in June 2019.

Senior
Koch was first called up to the Germany national football team in October 2019, and he made his debut on 9 October 2019 in a friendly against Argentina in which he started the game and played the whole match. His competitive debut for Germany came in his next appearance for the senior national team on 16 November 2019, starting in the 4–0 UEFA Euro 2020 qualifier victory against Belarus. He was called up to the Germany squad on 26 August 2020 for the UEFA Nations League fixtures against Spain and Switzerland. On 19 May 2021, he was selected to the squad for the UEFA Euro 2020.

Style of play
Koch plays mainly as a centre-back, but can also play as a defensive midfielder or as a central midfielder. He is described as a ball playing centre back and his style of play has been compared to that of Javi Martínez.

Personal life
He is the son of former professional footballer Harry Koch. His younger brother Louis plays for SV Alsenborn.

Career statistics

Club

International

Honours
Germany U21
UEFA European Under-21 Championship: runner-up 2019

References

External links
Profile at the Leeds United F.C. website

Living people
1996 births
People from Kaiserslautern
Association football defenders
German footballers
SV Eintracht Trier 05 players
1. FC Kaiserslautern II players
1. FC Kaiserslautern players
SC Freiburg players
Leeds United F.C. players
Premier League players
Regionalliga players
2. Bundesliga players
Bundesliga players
Footballers from Rhineland-Palatinate
Germany under-21 international footballers
Germany international footballers
UEFA Euro 2020 players
German expatriate footballers
German expatriate sportspeople in England
Expatriate footballers in England